Isabella Agbor Ayuk (born 10 May 1986) is a Nigerian ex-beauty queen, serial entrepreneur, actress and philanthropist. She is renowned for winning the Most Beautiful Girl in Nigeria 2012.

Personal life 
Although she likes to keep her personal life secret, in 2020 Ayuk was reported to have flaunted a photograph of her and a man on her WhatsApp status, the man whose name she did not disclose believed to have engaged her for marriage; and that was Ayuk's last known public appearance. Neither can it be confirmed if she and the man she flaunted have been married.

Early life
Born into a polygamous family, Ayuk is the twentieth out of twenty-four children. She studied Business Administration at the University of Calabar, graduating in 2011, and is currently serving as a youth corper. Prior to winning MBGN, she had been a veteran contestant who had competed in the 2009 and 2010 editions, as well as Miss Nigeria 2004, Miss South South 2007, and Miss Global Nigeria 2009. As one of the few contestants to represent their actual state of origin, Ayuk was the first South-South woman to win the title since Celia Bissong in 2003.

MGBN
Ayuk was crowned Most Beautiful Girl in Nigeria in a ceremony held at the Best Western Hotel in Benin City in May 2012. Her main platform is Typhoid Awareness in memory of her sister who died of the disease.

Controversy
Towards the end of May 2012, it was reported that Ayuk had falsified her age in order to compete in the pageant (she was said to be in her thirties when she finally won the title after participating in past editions), thus introducing the county's biggest pageant scandal since 2001 when Valerie Peterside was dethroned as Miss Nigeria for similar reasons. Although Ayuk herself didn't comment, organisers Silverbird came to her defense by stating that contrary to popular belief, Ayuk would not been dethroned and will continue her reign as MBGN 2012. She did not represent Nigeria at Miss World, but was replaced by MBGN 2012 runner-up Damiete Charles-Granville

Philanthropy 
Despite the controversies that surfaced during her reign as MBGN queen, Isabella remained one of the leading philanthropists in the history of pageantry in Africa. In 2012 Ayuk launched the Vanessa Manyor Memorial Foundation (VMMF), a foundation she named after Vanessa Manyor Ayuk, her late sister who died of typhoid fever. VMMF was committed to the protection of rural dwellers against the spread of typhoid fever, malaria, HIV\AIDS, tuberculosis and other opportunistic infections. Other of her charitable projects under VMMF include giving support to widows and giving scholarships to indigent kids.

Ayuk later changed VMMF to Isabella Ayuk Foundation (IAF), under which she continued her philanthropic deeds. Under IAF, one of her particular philanthropic acts that swept the internet was in 2018 when going after the aid of a certain widow who was thrown out of her home by the children of her late husband, despite being an ex- beauty queen Ayuk was said to have travelled the remotest part of Cross River even sailing by boat at some points to Bendeghe-Afi community, where the widow resides. That same year she reached out to widows and displaced refugees from Cameroon.

Ayuk is also known to be concerned about creating awareness about cervical cancer awareness and giving support to women living with the ailment. In 2019, the former MBGN Queen, provided free cervical cancer public and preventive education, Screening & Diagnosis services to underserved women in Cross River State through her foundation.

UN Representation and Peace Talks 
In 2018 Ayuk was among those who attended the United Nations Youth Assembly at the United Nations Headquarters, Manhattan, New York with the theme 'Innovation And Collaboration Of The Sustainable Development Goals’. The event, which kicked off on Wednesday, 14 February had Ayuk attending as a Youth Assembly Observer.

Isabella is an advocator for peace in Nigeria. In 2017 the ex Most Beautiful Girl in Nigeria called on Nigerians to embrace love, promote peace and unity of the country. She made the call  when the CRMBG queen, Miss Christine Edet, paid her a courtesy visit.

Business 
Apart from pageantry, Ayuk is known to be a serial entrepreneur doing multiple businesses including running a fashion line. On February 27, 2013, in Abuja, Nigeria's capital Ayuk launched her new fashion brand called Bellesabel, a coinage she made from combining the French word  meaning beauty, and Sabel, a shortening of her name Isabella.

Birthing Her Own Pageant 
On May 24, 2014 Ayuk initiated Cross River Most Beautiful Girl, (CRMBG) Pageant, the biggest state pageant in Nigeria to be run single-handedly by an individual in Nigeria.

Acting 
On her 27 birthday in 2013 at Clay Night club, Abuja, in a telephone interview with Obaji Akpet of the Nation Newspaper Ayuk announced plans to feature in a movie, Alok Monument, the pride within. Akpet later became Ayuk's publicist and worked for her CRMBG event as well.

References

External links
Official Most Beautiful Girl in Nigeria website

1986 births
Living people
Nigerian beauty pageant winners
Miss Universe 2012 contestants
Beauty pageant controversies
University of Calabar alumni
Most Beautiful Girl in Nigeria winners
Nigerian philanthropists
Most Beautiful Girl in Nigeria contestants
Nigerian beauty pageant contestants
Actresses from Cross River State
Nigerian humanitarians
Nigerian film actresses
Nigerian businesspeople
Nigerian female adult models
Nigerian women in business
21st-century Nigerian actresses